Soldaterkammerater på bjørnetjeneste is a 1968 Danish comedy film directed by Carl Ottosen and starring Preben Kaas.

Cast

 Preben Kaas - Private 12
 Paul Hagen - Private 13
 Willy Rathnov - Private 14
 Poul Bundgaard - Private 15
 Louis Miehe-Renard - Private 16
 Carl Ottosen - 1st Sergeant Vældegaard
 Dirch Passer - Guard Commander 419
 Nat Russell - Little Nat
 Karl Stegger - the Colonel
 Anja Owe - The Colonel's Granddaughter
 Ove Sprogøe - Colonel
 Bent Vejlby - Lieutenant Petersen
 Esper Hagen - Guard
 Mei-Mei - Leader of Children's camp
 Ole Monty - The Circus Director
 Else Petersen - The Chef / Miss Petersen
 Yvonne Ekmann - Leader of Children's camp
 Morten Grunwald - Doctor Bjørn Bille
 Tine Blichmann - Nurse Karen

External links

1968 films
1960s Danish-language films
1968 comedy films
Films directed by Carl Ottosen
Films scored by Sven Gyldmark
Danish comedy films